Jim or James Bradbury may refer to:

James W. Bradbury (1802–1901), United States Senator from Maine
James Bradbury Sr. (1857–1940), American character actor in D. W. Griffith's Abraham Lincoln (1930 film)
James Bradbury Jr. (1894–1936), American actor, son of above
Jim Bradbury (born 1937), British military historian

See also
James Bradberry (born 1993), American football cornerback for New York Giants